Bob, Bobby or Robert Murdoch may refer to:

Bob Murdoch (ice hockey, born 1946), Canadian ice hockey player (Montreal Canadiens, Los Angeles Kings) and head coach (Chicago Blackhawks, Winnipeg Jets)
Bob Murdoch (ice hockey, born 1954), Canadian ice hockey player with the California Golden Seals, Cleveland Barons, and St. Louis Blues
Bob Murdoch (Australian footballer) (1909–1965), Australian rules footballer
Bobby Murdoch (1944–2001), Scottish international football player for Celtic and Middlesbrough
Bobby Murdoch (footballer, born 1936) (1936–2017), English football player for Liverpool, Barrow, Stockport County, Carlisle United and Southport
Robert C. Murdoch (1861–1923), malacologist in New Zealand
Robin Murdoch (1911–1994), known as Bob Murdoch, Scottish athlete

See also
Rupert Murdoch (born 1931), international media magnate